Stephen McGowan (born 24 September 1984) is a Scottish footballer who plays as a striker for junior side Neilston.

Career
McGowan was a product of Dundee United's youth development programme and made his only appearance in the final game of the 2002–03 season. A loan spell with Ross County followed, before McGowan was released in February 2004, alongside fellow striker Danny Ogunmade. After a few seasons in U21 football, McGowan moved to Maryhill in 2006. He signed for Irvine Meadow XI a year later then moved once more, this time to Neilston, in September 2007.

McGowan appeared at under-16 and under-18 level for Scotland, featuring in the 2001 UEFA under-16 Championship.

See also
2002–03 Dundee United F.C. season

References

External links

1984 births
Living people
Dundee United F.C. players
Footballers from Glasgow
Ross County F.C. players
Scottish footballers
Scottish Premier League players
Irvine Meadow XI F.C. players
Maryhill F.C. players
Scotland youth international footballers
Association football forwards
Scottish Junior Football Association players
Neilston Juniors F.C. players